Drama remained an important part of the Edinburgh International Festival during its second decade. Almost all performances took place at the Royal Lyceum Theatre, The Assembly Hall, and the former Gateway Theatre.

More than 15 companies appeared during the decade, of which the most prolific were the London-based Old Vic Company and English Stage Company, the Royal Shakespeare Company from Stratford-upon-Avon, and the Edinburgh Gateway Company.

List

See also
Edinburgh International Festival
Drama at the Edinburgh International Festival: history and repertoire, 1947–1956
Opera at the Edinburgh International Festival: history and repertoire, 1947–1956
Opera at the Edinburgh International Festival: history and repertoire, 1957–1966
Opera at the Edinburgh International Festival: history and repertoire, 1967–1976
Ballet at the Edinburgh International Festival: history and repertoire, 1947–1956
Ballet at the Edinburgh International Festival: history and repertoire, 1957–1966
Ballet at the Edinburgh International Festival: history and repertoire, 1967–1976
Musicians at the Edinburgh International Festival, 1947 to 1956
Musicians at the Edinburgh International Festival, 1957–1966
Visual Arts at the Edinburgh International Festival, 1947–1976
World premieres at the Edinburgh International Festival

References

Edinburgh Festival
Annual events in Edinburgh
Theatre-related lists